Saint-Pierre-la-Vieille is a former commune in the Calvados department in the Normandy region in northwestern France. On 1 January 2016, it was merged into the new commune of Condé-en-Normandie.

History

World War II
After the liberation of the area by troops of  the British 50th infantry division in 1944, engineers of the Ninth Air Force IX Engineering Command began construction of a combat Advanced Landing Ground outside of the town.  Declared operational on 14 August, the airfield was designated as "A-19", it was used by the 370th Fighter Group which flew P-38 Lightnings until early September when the unit moved into Central France.  Afterward, the airfield was closed.

Population

See also
Communes of the Calvados department

References

Former communes of Calvados (department)
Calvados communes articles needing translation from French Wikipedia